Lake Lorelei is a gated community and census-designated place in Brown County, Ohio, United States, near the village of Fayetteville. As of the 2010 census, it had a population of 1,170.

History
Lake Lorelei was started in the late 1960s by property developers as a lakeside planned community.

Geography
Lake Lorelei is located in northern Brown County, in the western part of Perry Township. It consists of a housing development built around Lake Lorelei, a reservoir on Glady Run, a tributary of the East Fork of the Little Miami River.

State Route 131 forms the southern border of the CDP, and U.S. Route 50 touches the community's southeast corner.

Demographics

References

External links
Lake Lorelei Property Owners Association

Lorelei
Census-designated places in Ohio
Census-designated places in Brown County, Ohio
Lorelei
1960s establishments in Ohio